The Essential Bangles is a greatest hits album by American pop rock band the Bangles, released in 2004. The album includes 15 tracks from the band's first three studio albums, as well as non-studio album recordings and soundtrack contributions. It was released as a part of Sony BMG's The Essential series.

Track listing

Release history

Personnel 
The Bangles
 Susanna Hoffs – rhythm guitar, percussion, vocals
 Vicki Peterson – lead guitar, mandolin, electric sitar, vocals
 Michael Steele – bass guitar, acoustic guitar, vocals
 Debbi Peterson – drums, percussion, vocals
 Annette Zilinskas – bass guitar, harmonica, vocals ("I'm In Line")

References

2004 greatest hits albums
Albums produced by Craig Leon
Albums produced by David Kahne
Albums produced by Davitt Sigerson
Albums produced by Rick Rubin
The Bangles albums
Columbia Records compilation albums